Upasana (Sanskrit: उपासना ) literally means "worship" and "sitting near, attend to". The term also refers to one of three  (parts) of Vedas, one that focuses on worship.

Vedic literature, including Upasana Karunakar, is however, neither homogeneous in content nor in structure. Multiple classifications have been proposed.

Etymology
The root of the Sanskrit word Upasana is up and asana (from as), which means "to sit close to someone, waiting on someone with reverence". Oldenberg explained Upasana from its root Upās-, in German as Verehren, or "to worship, adore, revere", with the clarification that in Vedic texts this adoration and reverence is at formless things, such as Absolute Self, the Holy, the Atman (Soul) Principle. These texts offer the concept of Upasana to distinguish meditative reverence for an internalized and intellectual concept from earlier forms of physical worship, actual sacrifices and offerings to Vedic deities. Schayer offered a different perspective, stating Upasana in Vedic context is more closer to the German word Umwerben or Bedrängen, or courting and pressing on metaphysical Soul, the Absolute Self (the Brahman) with hopes and petitions. Schayer further states that Upasana was a psychological act as well as a procedure, which etymologically was further developed by Renou.

The concept of Upasana developed a large tradition in Vedanta era. It flowered into the meaning of an intense kind of systematic meditation. Adi Shankara described Upasana as that meditation "about someone or something, consisting of continuous succession of comparable basic concepts, without interspersing it with dissimilar concepts, that proceeds according to the scriptures and on idea enjoined in the scriptures". It is a state of concentration where "whatever is meditated upon" is completely identified, absorbed with self, and unified with as one identifies self consciousness with one's body. The two become one, "you are that". The "someone or something" in Upasana can be a symbolic deity or an abstract concept, states Shankara. In case of deity, Upasana is being one with god, which manifests as "be a god", and by "being a god, he attains the god."

Discussion
In one contemporary context, Upasana means methods of worship (Bhakti), usually of meditative kind. Werner translates it as "meditation", while Murty translates it as " steadfastness of mind in the thing meditated upon". Upasana is also sometimes referred to as Puja. However, a formal Puja is just one type of worship in Indian philosophy. Paul Deussen translates upasana as "meditation" and "worship", depending on the context.

In other contexts, Upasana refers to a part of the Vedic era texts relating to worship or meditation. The first parts of Vedas, composed the earliest, relate to sacrificial rituals. The second parts are Upasana-kanda, and the last parts relate to abstract philosophy and spirituality which are popularly called the Upanishads. In some cases, the Upasana chapters are embedded inside the Aranyakas. For example, in Rig Veda, first five of its books are called Aitareya Aranyaka. The 2nd and 3rd books are theosophical, and the first three sections of the 2nd book is called Prana Upasana (literally meaning, "worship of the vital energy"). The last three sections of the 2nd book constitutes the Aitareya Upanishad. The 3rd book of Rig Veda refers to Samhita Upasana (literally meaning, "unified form of worship"). Rig Veda has many books, and it includes many more Upasanas and Upanishads. Other Vedas follow a similar structure where they offer sections on rituals and action (Aranyakas), worship and deity oriented bhakti (Upasanas), as well as philosophical and abstract spirituality sections (Upanishads).

Edward Crangle, in his review, states that Upasana in Vedic text initially developed as a form of "substitute sacrifice", where symbolic meditation of the Aranyakas practice, instead of actual sacrifice ritual, offered a means to gain the same merit without the sacrifice. Over time, this idea shifted from meditating about the ritual, to internalization and meditation of the ideas and concepts associated. This may have marked a key evolution in Vedic era, one from ritual sacrifices to one contemplating spiritual ideas.

In the Vedas, some Upasanas are prescribed method of worship for pleasing and winning the attention of the deity or it can be a deity-less practice of austerities involving meditating upon some aspect of nature as told in specific Vedic Upasanas. Puranas are another source for upasana procedures.

Sri Chandrashekarendra Saraswati, the 68th Jagadguru Shankaracharya of the Kanchi Kamakoti Peetham states

"Upaasana is dhyaana or concentration of meditation. A form is required for concentration. Reality is always the same and changeless. God, as the Ultimate Reality, is Formless. But Upasana of a Form is done with a purpose, namely, the attainment of a given benefit. The purpose to be attained by worshipping or concentrating on a Form differs. The scriptures tell you how to meditate and on what all Forms and with what results. For Upasana, you have to follow the Sastras or Scriptures. The different upasanas are all aids in the path to the ultimate goal, namely, understanding Reality. Scriptures prescribe Upaasana in order to train the mind to concentrate. Upasana is the affair of the individual; there is nothing collective about it".

See also
Aranyaka
Veda
Upanishad
Bhakti
Puja

References

Further reading
Klaus G Witz (1998), The Supreme Wisdom of the Upaniṣads: An Introduction, Chapter 3

Hindu philosophical concepts
Vedas